is a 1971 Japanese feature-length experimental drama film directed by Shūji Terayama. A metaphor for Japan's descent into materialism, it follows a young man's disillusionment with the world around him and his determination to achieve something in life while his family members are content with their poor social and economic standing. It was Terayama's first feature-length film.

Reception
The film won the grand prize at the San Remo Film Festival, and was voted the ninth best Japanese film of 1971 in the Kinema Junpo poll of film critics.

References

External links

1970s Japanese-language films
1971 films
Japanese avant-garde and experimental films
Films directed by Shūji Terayama
1970s Japanese films